Here is a list of all the different Nintendo 64 ROM Formats.

Normal ROM Files 

.bin
.jap
 Used to indicate ROM dumps of games released in Japan, in any format
.n64
 Indicates ROM dumps stored in little-endian byte-order
.N64
 The Extension used by the makerom utility of GCCexe as part of the official SDK. It's in the Big Endian format:
 NSME (Nintendo Super Mario English)
 Address(hex)|-3B-|-3C-|-3D-|-3E-| 
 Value (hex)  |-4E-|-53-|-4D-|-45-|
 Value (Ascii)|--N-|--S-|--M-|--E-| 
.pal
 Used to indicate ROM dumps of games released in Europe/Australia, in any format.
.rom
.u64
.v64
 ROM dumps produced by or compatible with the Doctor V64, with data stored in a byte-swapped version of the N64's native byte-order
.usa
 Used to indicate ROM dumps of games released in North America, in any format
.z64
 ROM dumps produced by or compatible with the Z64 and the Retrode, with data stored in the N64's native big-endian byte-order

N64 Dynamic Drive 
.d64
 n64mdisk (SDK) output format. Big Endian.

Other playable formats 

Some emulators can play ROMs that are within a compressed .7z or .zip file.

Order Tables

See also 

Nintendo 64
Emulation
List of file formats
Project64

References

External links 
Project64 Home Page
EmuTalk Emulation Forums

Nintendo 64